Chad Netherland is an American strongman, martial artist and businessman. His feats of strength include escaping from a set of handcuffs in 1.59 seconds, holding two planes from takeoff for a little over a minute and breaking 50 blocks of ice in 19.26 seconds.

Selected world records
Below is a list of selected Guinness World Records achieved by Chad Netherland, all of which relate to martial arts and strength.

Longest time restraining two aircraft – 1 minute 0.6 seconds (Superior, Wisconsin, July 7, 2007)
Fastest time to escape from a pair of handcuffs (double locked) – 1.59 seconds (Las Vegas, Nevada, January 8, 2011)
Fastest time to bend 10 nails – 21.13 seconds (St. Louis, Missouri, July 14, 2006)
Fastest time breaking 50 blocks of ice – 19.26 seconds
Fastest time to rip ten packs of cards – 46 seconds

Early life
Netherland grew up in Biloxi, Mississippi. His father Dan ran a martial arts studio, and his mother taught at the studio as well.

Strength

Netherland claims to have a "limitless" grip strength. On the set for the episode Unbreakable of the documentary Stan Lee's Superhumans, in which Netherland was featured, biomechanics professor John Mercer of the University of Nevada measured how strong Netherlands grip was using a handgrip dynamometer. Test results showed that Netherland's grip strength was around 20 to 30 pounds stronger than the average human.

He holds ten Guinness World Records.

Career

Martial arts
Netherland has trained in martial arts since he was a child, and holds an 8th Dan in Aiki-jujutsu, 5th Dan in Kempo, and 5th Dan in Judo.

Reality television
He has appeared on many reality television programs, such as the documentary Stan Lee's Superhumans, The Rachael Ray Show, and Ripley's Believe It or Not!.

Television Commercials
Guinness Book of World Records the videogame (Nintendo Wii and DS)

Movies

2012 – Vandroid the Movie

References

External links
Official website

American martial artists
Living people
Year of birth missing (living people)